The 1960 New York Yankees season was the 58th season for the team. The team finished with a record of 97–57, winning its 25th pennant, finishing 8 games ahead of the Baltimore Orioles. New York was managed by Casey Stengel. The Yankees played their home games at Yankee Stadium. In the World Series, they were defeated by the Pittsburgh Pirates in seven games.

Offseason
 December 11, 1959: Don Larsen, Hank Bauer, Norm Siebern, and Marv Throneberry were traded by the Yankees to the Kansas City Athletics for Roger Maris, Joe DeMaestri and Kent Hadley.
 Prior to 1960 season: Jesse Gonder was acquired by the Yankees from the Cincinnati Reds.

Regular season
Elston Howard took over as the Yankees' everyday catcher, while Yogi Berra split time between the outfield and serving as Howard's backup.

Season standings

Record vs. opponents

Notable transactions
 May 19, 1960: Andy Carey was traded by the Yankees to the Kansas City Athletics for Bob Cerv.

Roster

Player stats

Batting

Starters by position
Note: Pos = Position; G = Games played; AB = At bats; H = Hits; Avg. = Batting average; HR = Home runs; RBI = Runs batted in

Other batters
Note: G = Games played; AB = At bats; H = Hits; Avg. = Batting average; HR = Home runs; RBI = Runs batted in

Pitching

Starting pitchers
Note: G = Games pitched; IP = Innings pitched; W = Wins; L = Losses; ERA = Earned run average; SO = Strikeouts

Other pitchers
Note: G = Games pitched; IP = Innings pitched; W = Wins; L = Losses; ERA = Earned run average; SO = Strikeouts

Relief pitchers
Note: G = Games pitched; W = Wins; L = Losses; SV = Saves; ERA = Earned run average; SO = Strikeouts

1960 World Series 

NL Pittsburgh Pirates (4) vs. AL New York Yankees (3)

Awards and honors
 Roger Maris, American League MVP
 Bobby Richardson, World Series MVP

Farm system

LEAGUE CHAMPIONS: Greensboro

Notes

References
1960 New York Yankees at Baseball Reference
1960 World Series
1960 New York Yankees at Baseball Almanac

New York Yankees seasons
New York Yankees
New York Yankees
1960s in the Bronx
American League champion seasons